An annular solar eclipse occurred on April 29, 1995. A solar eclipse occurs when the Moon passes between Earth and the Sun, thereby totally or partly obscuring the image of the Sun for a viewer on Earth. An annular solar eclipse occurs when the Moon's apparent diameter is smaller than the Sun's, blocking most of the Sun's light and causing the Sun to look like an annulus (ring). An annular eclipse appears as a partial eclipse over a region of the Earth thousands of kilometres wide. Annularity was visible in Peru, southeastern Ecuador, southeastern Colombia and Brazil.

Images

Related eclipses

Eclipses of 1995 
 A partial lunar eclipse on April 15.
 An annular solar eclipse on April 29.
 A penumbral lunar eclipse on October 8.
 A total solar eclipse on October 24.

Solar eclipses 1993–1996

Saros 138 
It is a part of Saros cycle 138, repeating every 18 years, 11 days, containing 70 events. The series started with partial solar eclipse on June 6, 1472. It contains annular eclipses from August 31, 1598, through February 18, 2482 with a hybrid eclipse on March 1, 2500. It has total eclipses from March 12, 2518, through April 3, 2554. The series ends at member 70 as a partial eclipse on July 11, 2716. The longest duration of totality will be only 56 seconds on April 3, 2554.
<noinclude>

Metonic series

References

External links

Photos:
  A Fleeting Eclipse, annular eclipse from Macara, Ecuador APOD 8/27/1997,

1995 4 29
1995 in science
1995 4 29
April 1995 events